Demandbase is an account-based marketing (ABM), advertising, sales intelligence and data company. Its products provide business-to-business (B2B) companies sales and marketing support that helps users discover, manage, and measure target audiences. This includes identifying web visitors, targeting and engaging accounts, closing deals, and helping to grow customers. Demandbase One, the company’s suite of cloud products, provides account-based marketing (ABM) and ABX, B2B advertising, sales intelligence, and data capabilities. These products integrate into other advertising, marketing, and sales technologies including marketing automation, customer relationship management, web analytics, content and personalization, and other services.

History

Headquartered in San Francisco, Demandbase was founded in 2007 by then CEO Chris Golec. Golec was replaced as CEO by the company's Chief Revenue Officer Gabe Rogol in 2019, and left the company in 2021.

The company released Demandbase Central in August 2008. Demandbase Professional followed in February 2009.

Demandbase bought data provider WhoToo in 2015. This helped the company extend its targeting capabilities. In June 2016, Spiderbook, a data science startup, was acquired. In 2018, the company was the Forrester Wave Leader for account-based marketing.

In 2020 and 2021, Demandbase broadened its offering through significant acquisitions. In June 2020, the company announced the acquisition of another ABM solution, Engagio, which added the capability of nurturing accounts based on first-party data to Demandbase's ability to identify and target accounts through third-party data. Jon Miller, co-founder of Engagio, and previously of Marketo became Chief Marketing Officer at Demandbase.

In November 2020, Demandbase released Demandbase One, a new version of its platform, built by integrating Demandbase Classic and Engagio.

In May 2021, the company announced the acquisitions of B2B data and sales intelligence platform InsideView and technographics vendor DemandMatrix. This allowed the Demandbase suite, going forward, to incorporate a Sales Intelligence Cloud and a Data Cloud to complement its existing ABX (Account Based Experience) Cloud and Advertising Cloud.

Demandbase was named a Leader in Gartner’s 2022 Magic Quadrant for Account-Based Marketing Platforms.

Investors
In March 2013, Demandbase announced it had raised $15 million in its most recent funding round led by Scale Venture Partners. Demandbase's investors also include Sigma Partners, Altos Ventures, Costanoa Ventures, Sutter Hill Ventures and Adobe Systems.

By 2017, Demandbase had raised a total of $158 million from investors including Salesforce Ventures, and Jackson Square Ventures.

References

Companies established in 2007
Companies based in San Francisco
2007 establishments in California